San Francisco is a town and municipality in Antioquia Department, Colombia. Part of the subregion of Eastern Antioquia.

History
San Francisco was previously known as El Morrón.

It was founded in 1830 as part of the municipality of Cocorná. In February 1986 was established as a municipality with the name of San Francisco, in memory of Saint Francis of Assisi.

Climate
San Francisco has a tropical rainforest climate (Af). It has very heavy rainfall year-round.

Demographics 

Total Population: 5 318 people. (2015)
 Urban Population: 2 446
 Rural Population: 2 872
Literacy Rate: 75.5% (2005)
 Urban Areas: 77.9%
 Rural Areas: 74.2%

References

Municipalities of Antioquia Department
1830 establishments in Gran Colombia